Sergio Bergamelli (born 16 August 1970) is an Italian former World Cup alpine skier who competed in the 1992 Winter Olympics and 1998 Winter Olympics.

Career
In his career Bergamelli has participated in two Winter Olympics, a world championship. He won a World Cup race in giant (1992) and an Italian title (1995), also in giant.

The four Bergamelli ski brothers
The Bergamellis were four brothers, Sergio (born 1970), Norman (born 1971), Thomas (born 1973) and Giancarlo (born 1974), and all four were World Cup alpine skiers.

World Cup results
Wins

References

External links
 

1970 births
Living people
Italian male alpine skiers
Olympic alpine skiers of Italy
Alpine skiers at the 1992 Winter Olympics
Alpine skiers at the 1998 Winter Olympics
Alpine skiers of Fiamme Gialle
People from Alzano Lombardo
Sportspeople from the Province of Bergamo
20th-century Italian people